In September 2003, Barnes & Noble Books of New York began to publish The Collector's Library series of some of the world's most notable literary works.  By October 2005, fifty-nine volumes had been printed.  Each unabridged volume is book size octodecimo, or 4 x 6-1/2 inches, printed in hardback, on high-quality paper, bound in real cloth, and contains a dust jacket. In 2015, The Collector's Library was acquired by Pan Macmillan.

The stories

Sorted by publication date, then alphabetical by author

21 Sep 2003: Emma by Jane Austen
21 Sep 2003: Pride and Prejudice by Jane Austen
21 Sep 2003: Sense and Sensibility by Jane Austen
21 Sep 2003: Jane Eyre by Charlotte Brontë
21 Sep 2003: Wuthering Heights by Emily Brontë
21 Sep 2003: Great Expectations by Charles Dickens
21 Sep 2003: Oliver Twist by Charles Dickens
21 Sep 2003: A Tale of Two Cities by Charles Dickens
21 Sep 2003: Madame Bovary by Gustave Flaubert
21 Sep 2003: The Scarlet Letter by Nathaniel Hawthorne
21 Sep 2003: Tales of Mystery and Imagination by Edgar Allan Poe
21 Sep 2003: Dracula by Bram Stoker
21 Sep 2003: The Picture of Dorian Gray by Oscar Wilde
?? Jan 2004: The Communist Manifesto (selections) by Karl Marx and Socialism: Utopian and Scientific by Friedrich Engels
04 Mar 2004: Mansfield Park by Jane Austen
04 Mar 2004: Northanger Abbey by Jane Austen
04 Mar 2004: Persuasion by Jane Austen
04 Mar 2004: The Secret Garden by Frances Hodgson Burnett
04 Mar 2004: Alice's Adventures in Wonderland and Through the Looking-Glass by Lewis Carroll
04 Mar 2004: The Red Badge of Courage and Other Stories by Stephen Crane
04 Mar 2004: Crime and Punishment by Fyodor Dostoevsky
04 Mar 2004: Adventures of Sherlock Holmes by Arthur Conan Doyle
04 Mar 2004: The Count of Monte Cristo by Alexandre Dumas
04 Mar 2004: The Iliad by Homer
04 Mar 2004: The Odyssey by Homer
04 Mar 2004: Just So Stories by Rudyard Kipling
04 Mar 2004: Tales and Poems of Edgar Allan Poe by Edgar Allan Poe
04 Mar 2004: Frankenstein by Mary Shelley
04 Mar 2004: The Strange Case of Dr. Jekyll and Mr. Hyde by Robert Louis Stevenson
04 Mar 2004: Treasure Island by Robert Louis Stevenson
04 Mar 2004: Uncle Toms Cabin by Harriet Beecher Stowe
04 Mar 2004: Walden by Henry David Thoreau
04 Mar 2004: Adventures of Huckleberry Finn by Mark Twain
04 Mar 2004: The Adventures of Tom Sawyer by Mark Twain
30 Aug 2004: Grimms' Fairy Tales by Brothers Grimm
30 Aug 2004: The Last of the Mohicans by James Fenimore Cooper
30 Aug 2004: A Christmas Carol & and Other Christmas Stories by Charles Dickens
30 Aug 2004: The Brothers Karamazov by Fyodor Dostoevsky
30 Aug 2004: Case-Book of Sherlock Holmes by Arthur Conan Doyle
30 Aug 2004: Hound of the Baskervilles and The Valley of Fear by Arthur Conan Doyle
30 Aug 2004: The Three Musketeers by Alexandre Dumas
30 Aug 2004: The Hunchback of Notre-Dame by Victor Hugo
30 Aug 2004: The Portrait of a Lady by Henry James
30 Aug 2004: The Phantom of the Opera by Gaston Leroux
30 Aug 2004: The Call of the Wild and White Fang by Jack London
30 Aug 2004: The Prince & The Art of War by Niccolò Machiavelli
30 Aug 2004: Moby-Dick by Herman Melville
30 Aug 2004: Ivanhoe by Walter Scott
30 Aug 2004: Gulliver's Travels by Jonathan Swift
30 Aug 2004: Anna Karenina by Leo Tolstoy
30 Aug 2004: The Aeneid by Virgil
30 Aug 2004: The Age of Innocence by Edith Wharton
30 Aug 2004: Leaves of Grass by Walt Whitman
10 Oct 2005: The Wind in the Willows by Kenneth Grahame
10 Oct 2005: Lady Chatterleys Lover by D. H. Lawrence
10 Oct 2005: Around the World in Eighty Days by Jules Verne

References

Sources

Series of books
Barnes & Noble